Ujhari is a town and a nagar panchayat in Amroha district in the Indian state of Uttar Pradesh.

Demographics
 India census, Ujhari has a population of 24,488. Males constitute 51% of the population and females 49%. Ujhari has an average literacy rate of 58.20% lower than state average of 67.68%: male literacy is 66.28%, and female literacy is 49.62%. In Ujhari, 18.69% of the population is under 6 years of age.

Notable residents
Kamal Akhtar

References

Cities and towns in Amroha district